Student federations have been growing in popularity and significance in Pakistan over the past few years. This has been attributed to the increasing social disparity between the younger and older generation of the country. 66% of population of Pakistan is currently under the age of 30, and approximately only 5% of the population is over the age of 65.  Researchers have noted the significance of political youth organizations in social environments such as these, and have project that the youth organizations in Pakistan will help define the future of the nation over the next few years. Reporters have noted that Pakistan's political climate is in a current state of divisive unrest. Political actions taken within the country have simultaneously sparked public celebrations and large-scale riots. Because of the demographics of the country, the population under age 30 has been very involved in these public actions, and the youth and student organizations have been prominent. A new student organization, mathematical society GPGC Haripur was formed on 1 January, 2023, under the patronage of Professor Naeem Akhtar Abbasi, chairmanship of Professor Aftab Ahmed, coordination of Professor Syed Bilal Shah and presidency of Syed Hamza Kazmi.  The society has more than 30 members.

Background

The first student political group in Pakistan was the Muslim Students Federation. Started in 1947, as a student wing of the Muslim League, the Muslim Students Federation held prominence in Pakistan until the Muslim League splinted shortly after coming to power. The 1950s saw the rise of two kinds of political student parties; Left leaning Marxist parties like the Democratic Students Federation, and religious right wing parties like Anjuman Talba-e-islam and Islami Jamiat-e-Talaba. The leftist groups were not treated kindly by the ruling powers at the time, and in 1953 during a protest led by the Democratic Student Federation, the police shot into the crowd killing six students. The next year the same group was banned from the country for its possible ties to the Communist party of Pakistan, followed shortly thereafter by a ban of its successor group the All Pakistan Students Organization. These groups were succeeded by yet another leftist group, the National Students Federation, which continues on to this day.

The student unions in the 1960s were characterized primarily as a struggle for power between the Maoist-Soviet leaning left and the religious right, with the leftist National Students Federation and the National Students Organization coming out on top. The 1970s brought with it a rise in student political action as the 1974 Student Union Ordinance was passed. This Ordinance actually encouraged student activity on campus, and several prominent new student organizations came into existence and grew during this time. Meanwhile, the struggle between the Marxist and religious student associations grew, with both sides creating their own respective alliances, though both groups suffered from political infighting and splintering.

Through the late 1970s and into the 1980s the student groups began to clash violently with each other and the government.

Current issues
There are currently three major issues driving the political activist groups in Pakistan. These issues are a lack of educational opportunities, jobs, and ideological differences.

Education
The public education system has three major problems facing it right now. First, there is a shortage of teachers and schools within the country. Approximately 33% of the children in Pakistan are not attending school, and even the ones who are may not have an actual teacher in the classroom. Second, the public education system is outdated by over 30 years. The textbooks used in the majority of public schools were written in the 1980s and they tend to lead students to be more susceptible to adaptation to radical forms of Islam. Third is the stark difference between the private and public education systems. The top ten percent of the country send their children to private schools that speak English, instead of Urdu, and most children coming out of the private education system tend to be dismissive of their Urdu-speaking counterparts. This is creating a strong communication and familial rift between the educated population of Pakistan.

Jobs
The job market in Pakistan is not promising for students coming out of the education system. The unemployment rate in 2008 was estimated at 24.67%. This was attributed to a large part of the student population getting educated for technical jobs that are not in high demand in the country. Approximately 85% of Pakistanis only make $4 per day, which is not an appealing prospect to college graduates in Pakistan. This disparity of expectations is mobilizing factor behind a significant number of student federations.

Ideological differences
The student federations of Pakistan have been known to engage in fights over political, religious, ethnic, nationalist, and sectarian differences. Several students die each year in the physical confrontations that frequently break out between groups during protests.

Students Islamic Federations

Islami Jamiat-e-Talaba Pakistan (IJT) 

Islami Jamiat-e-Talaba is the largest student organization founded just after the independence of Pakistan on 23 December 1947. Since then it has been struggling for the rights of the students and for eliminating the non-Islamic aspects from our schools, colleges, and universities. It is kind of affiliated with Jamat-e-Islami. It is mainly influenced by the ideology of Syed Ab-ul-Aala Maududi. It is the only student organization in Pakistan that is present throughout the country and Bangladesh, and at every level (school, college, university). Zinda ha Jamiat (Zinda ha)
Quwat hi Quwat (Jamiat), Quwat ka Nara (Jamiat), Mera laj dulara (Jamiat), Ankhon ka tara (Jamiat)
Nara e Takbir (Allah o Akbar)

Muslim Students Organization  Pakistan (MSO)

Muslim Students Organization Pakistan (Urdu: مسلم سٹوڈنٹس آرگنائزیشن پاکستان‎) is a Islamic Students organization in Pakistan. It was founded on 11th January 2001. It has around 1500 units in Pakistan, covering all the four provinces of Pakistan, Federally Administered Tribal Areas, Azad Kashmir and Gilgit-Baltistan.
Mission
To propagate the real Islamic culture in each and every educational institution of Pakistan to bridge the gap between students of Universities & Madaris and to work for the rights of students To awake the youth about the realities of the betrayed persons who through politics are deceiving the nation and are doing such activities which are against our country… so MSO can be regarded as the movement of Self-awareness of the youth.

Jamiat Talba-e-islam Pakistan (JTI)

Jamiat Talba-e-Islam is an independent student organization of Pakistan under the supervision of Ulema-e-Haq i.e. Jamiat Ulema-e-Islam (F). It was founded by some students on 19 October 1969 at Jamia Hammadia, Lahore, Pakistan. Jamiat Talba-e-Islam Pakistan is working in Pakistan to eliminate the non-Islamic elements and secularism from the curriculum and teachings of the educational institutions of Pakistan.

Anjuman Talba-e-islam

Anjuman Talaba-e-Islam ("Islamic Organization of Students") is the non-political student organization founded on 20 January 1968 with respect to 20th Shawwal 1387 A.H at Sabz Masjid Sarafa Bazaar, Karachi, Pakistan by a group of students. In 1986 student union elections in all cities of Pakistan, ATI came forward as the leading victorious Student Organization by taking more than 80% results. The current President is Mubashar Hussain from karachi, Pakistan.

Pakistan Islamic Students Federation

It is unclear when the Pakistan Islamic Students Federation (PISF or APISF) was founded, though its internet presence was established on February 24, 2012. PISF is an Islamic group in Pakistan best known for its protests of Danish Prime Minister Anders Fogh Rasmussen and the Danish cartoons depicting Muhammad, where they called for the public hanging of the Danish cartoonists.

Imamia Students Organization

Imamia Students Organisation is a Shi'a Muslim students organisation in Pakistan. It was founded by Dr. Mohammad Ali Naqvi on 22 May 1972 at University of Engineering and Technology, Lahore. In 2012 it had "around 1200 units in Pakistan," covering all the five provinces of Pakistan, Tribal areas, Azad Jamu, Kashmir and Gilgit Baltistan.

Allegations were directed against ISO that they receive funding from Iran. ISO counters those allegations, stating that they only receive moral guidance from Iran.

Muslim Student Federation

Muslim Student Federation or MSF is a conservative Pakistani political group that was started on September 1, 1937, in Calcutta, India by the old All-India Muslim League. The group has a wing in Pakistan that is led by Rana Arshad. and Rana Hassnain leading in Punjab as senior vice president along with coordinator Green Tiger. The student federation has also been known to engage in fights previously with some of the progressive student federations and exhibit an independent mildly conservative nature.

In Pakistan MSF-N is aligned to the PML-N, which is a centre-right party.

Progressive and Marxist groups

The Struggle

The Struggle (Urdu: طبقاتی جدوجہد‎) is a Trotskyist, Leftist organization in Pakistan which was found in Netherlands by Lal Khan and other Pakistani activists. The group follows the ideology of Karl Marx, Friedrich Engels, Vladimir Lenin and Leon Trotsky.

It is the only organization working physically into people and politicizing students and workers.

The Struggle group has their own publication agency and has published numerous books and leaflets on topics including Marxist ideology, history of Marxist struggle in Pakistan, and various books covering history of Bolshevik revolution.

The Struggle's trade union front is known as Pakistan Trade Union Defence Campaign (PTUDC), and multiple other fronts working among Youth, including Revolutionary Students Front (RSF) and Unemployed Youth Movement. In 2015, youth and students fronts of the Struggle started a campaign to bring together prominent left-wing students and youth organizations from across the country on a single platform. It holds its regularly congress which are held every year to analyse the performance of The Struggle and to formulate new strategies for social change and revolution. In March 2013, Malala Yousafzai sent solidarity message to The Struggle congress.

Democratic Students Federation (DSF)

Democratic Students Federation founded in 1949, and being the oldest leftist student federation in Pakistan many other left leaning student political organizations can trace their heritage back to this group. The DSF was banned in 1956 because of its political association with the communist party, which resulted in several other student groups forming from its ashes, like the National Students Federation and the Liberal Students Federation. The DSF was allowed to reorganize in 1980, and grew in popularity because of its connection to the then powerful Soviet Union. This popularity faded after dissolution of the Soviet Union, and the group restructured itself in 2011 to adapt to more current issues. The groups stated mission is to, "bring back the balance of power to the students in universities which is formerly lost." Nowadays, both the NSF and ISF claim common heritage from the old DSF.

JUTT Student Federation
JUTT Students Federation was formed in 2010 as a faction/group that split off from the JUTT Students Federation.Chairman Ch Ijaz jutt And General Secretary Ch Umar Saleem Ghumman .

National Students Federation
National Students Federation (NSF) was formed from the remnants of the Democratic Students Federation when it was banned in 1956. The group is a self-proclaimed revolutionary left and centre-left student federation whose stated goals are to:
 Struggle for a class free education system and all rights of the student community
 Struggle for free education for all
 Struggle for improvement in the conditions of all educational institutes
 Promote peace, tolerance and unity amongst students
 To link students with the international movements against capitalist, imperialist oppression.

In 2008 the group was reorganized during the Lawyers' Movement, and now primarily operates out of Punjab, though its values remain mostly the same and just like the old DSF gave birth to the powerful NSF recently in a similar way the NSF has helped give birth to the programme of the newly formed Insaf Student Federation (ISF).

Liberal Students Federation
Liberal Students Federation was formed in 1973 as a faction/group that split off from the National Students Federation.

Insaf Students Federation

This is the student federation of PTI and generally has links to the old NSF and considers itself on the left and centre left on the basic issues of students. 
It is considered the Student body for PTI Insafains and its future leaders.

Peoples Students Federation

Peoples Students Federation is a students-led organisation attempts to mobilize the youth for Peoples Party candidates for the Youth Parliament. It also has the separate Trotskyist-Marxist wing, " International Marxist Tendency (IMT); the student wing, the Peoples Students, a student-outreach organization with the goal is Stalinism but recently its parent party is considered pro-American in Pakistani politics unlike the ISF and PTI.

All Pakistan Muttahida Students Organization

The All Pakistan Muttahida Students Organization  (APMSO) is notable for being the student organization that created Pakistan's 4th Notional Political Party, the Mohajir Quami Movement, now called the Muttahida Qaumi Movement (MQM).

APMSO was founded by Altaf Hussain along with other students include Azeem Ahmed Tariq, Dr. Imran Farooq and others on Sunday, June 11, 1978 at Karachi University. Hussain also served as a first Chairman of the organization while Azeem Ahmed Tariq served as the first General Secretary of the organization.

While the APMSO platform has some liberal elements to it, at its core it is the ethnic political party of the Muhajir, an Urdu speaking people who immigrated from India in 1947.  It was later renamed the All Pakistan Muttahida Students Organization (APMSO) and is still known by this name. It is arguably the most active and well-organised student union in Sindh public sector universities and organises many activities for general students.

Progressive Students Federation
Progressive Students Federation (PrSF) is a socialist, left-wing students’ organization based in Pakistan, formed in 2014.

Liberal democratic and politically unaligned groups

Pakistani Youth Movement
Pakistani Youth Movement was started sometime in 2010 for the stated goal of harnessing the educated youth of Pakistan to make the country as a better place. The group claims to not have any ties to political or religious entities, and does not have the structured leadership normally found within a political party. The group has posted videos about their active role in giving relief to flood victim and their support of the Teach for Pakistan Movement in 2011.

Youth Association of Pakistan
Youth Association of Pakistan (YAP) is one of the leading youth organisation of Pakistan. This organisation was founded by Kashif Zaheer Kamboh and other youth leaders. YAP is working with youth of Pakistan to project the better image of Pakistan.

Pakistan Youth Council
Pakistan Youth Council (PYC) was started by Mian Muhammad Arfat in 2010, as a membership based democratically aligned youth organization. The group's mission is to, "create economic, political and social awareness among youth and enable them to protect and claim their rights e.g. education, health, employment and sports." The PYC has promoted the role of youth in politics through educational conferences and lobbying for age reduction for parliamentary candidacy.

Youth Parliament of Pakistan
Youth Parliament of Pakistan (YPP) is a democratically oriented activism group started in 2006. The group does not a political or religious affiliation, and primarily works on educating the youth of Pakistan about the ideas of democracy. In 2009, YPP started the Youth Action for Democracy in collaboration with the United Nations Democracy Fund. This project was aimed at increasing democratic education and youth participation in politics in the districts of Punjab, Balochistan, Khyber Pakhtoonkhwa, Sindh, and Azad Jammu Kashmir.

Karachi Youth's Federation
Karachi Youth's Federation (KYF) is a youth organization of Karachi who is working to alliance youth patriotically for professional development and public welfare. Chairman Muhammad Umer Khan founded in 2008 on June 20. KYF is pro Pakistan and supporting Armed Forces for a good Civil Military Relations.

Independent youth participation
Many independent young people participates in politics either through social media activism or through election participation and their participation strengthens the democracy and provides the good image of the country

List of student federations, political alliances, and affiliations

Notable student federations include:

References

Students' federations of Pakistan
Students
Student